Axis of Eden is the eighth album by Today Is the Day, released on September 18, 2007 by SuperNova Records, an independent label ran by Steve Austin. It is the last album to feature bassist Chris Debari and the only Today Is the Day album to feature Derek Roddy. In 2008, a film was produced based on the album, titled Axis of Eden - The Film, which was released via digital download through SuperNova.

The track "Free At Last" was written on piano after a fight broke out between Steve Austin and his wife. The track "Broken Promises and Dead Dreams" was written about Relapse Records.

Track listing

Personnel 
Adapted from the Axis of Eden liner notes.
Today Is the Day
Steve Austin – vocals, guitar, piano, production, mixing, mastering, cover art
Chris Debari – bass guitar
Derek Roddy – drums

Release history

References 

2007 albums
Today Is the Day albums